Charles Sumner Duke (July 21, 1879 – June 15, 1952) was an architect, engineer, and public official who advocated for opportunities for African Americans and helped found the National Technical Association (NTA) in 1925. Newspaperman and civil rights leader Jesse Duke was his father.

Early life and education 
Duke was born in Selma, Alabama. His father, Jesse Duke, was a newspaper publisher whose anti-lynching editorial elicited a response that caused the family to flee to Pine Bluff, Arkansas.

Duke studied at Branch Normal College, the Art Institute of Chicago, Phillips Exeter Academy, and graduated from Harvard University and the University of Wisconsin.

Career and military service 
He moved to Chicago in 1908. He was hired by the city of Chicago's Department of Public Works, Bureau of Engineering, in 1914, as a construction engineer. In 1916, Duke joined the U.S. Army, serving on the Mexican border with the Engineer Corps. He left with an honorable discharge and the rank of first lieutenant. He later went to work for Chicago's Bridge Division, and headed the city's Zoning Commission. As an architect, Duke helped with the initial construction of the Ida B. Wells project in Chicago, Illinois, and the design of the Newport News Homestead. In 1938, Duke accepted a position for the U.S. government to lead construction in the U.S. Virgin Islands. 

He founded the National Technical Association (NTA) in 1925 and served as its first president.  In 1932, Duke and the NTA advocated against the closure of Howard University's School of Engineering.

Duke died from complications related to a blood clot after surgery for cancer. The NTA's Charles S. Duke Distinguished Lecture Series is named for him.

External links 

 Photos of the Ida B. Wells Housing Project, the Art Institute of Chicago

References

1879 births
1952 deaths
20th-century American architects
African-American architects
Architects from Alabama
Harvard University alumni
20th-century African-American artists